Montreal Centre was a federal electoral district in Quebec, Canada, that was represented in the House of Commons of Canada from 1867 to 1892.

It was created by the British North America Act, 1867.  It consisted initially of the West Ward, the Centre Ward and the East Ward of the city of Montreal. In 1872, it was redefined to consist of the Ste. Anne Ward, West Ward, Centre Ward and East Ward.

It was abolished in 1892 when it was redistributed into St. Anne and St. James ridings.  Nevertheless, a by-election was held in Montreal Centre on December 27, 1895.

Members of Parliament

This riding elected the following Members of Parliament:

Election results

By-election: On election being declared void, 31 October 1874

By-election: On Mr. Devlin being unseated on petition, 26 August 1875

By-election: On Mr. Curran being appointed Solicitor General, 5 December 1892

By-election: On Mr. Curran being appointed Puisne Judge of the Superior Court of Quebec, 18 October 1895

See also 

 List of Canadian federal electoral districts
 Past Canadian electoral districts

External links
Riding history from the Library of Parliament

Former federal electoral districts of Quebec